Reardon is a surname of Irish Gaelic origin. It is an anglisation of the modern Irish Gaelic Ó Ríordáin, which itself in turn derived from the original 'Ó Ríoghbhardáin', meaning royal bard (from the Irish Gaelic words, rí = king, and the diminutive form of bard). Notable people with the surname include:
 Beans Reardon (1897–1984), American umpire in Major League Baseball
 Bill Reardon (born 1941), American politician and educator
 Casper Reardon (1907–1941), classical and later jazz harpist
 David Reardon, American director of the Elliot Institute
 Dom Reardon, British comics artist (2000AD)
 Jack Reardon (1914–1991), Australian rugby league footballer and writer
 Jeff Reardon (born 1955), American baseball relief pitcher
 Jim Reardon (born 1965), director and storyboard consultant (The Simpsons)
 John Reardon (born 1975), Canadian actor and former college football player
 John Reardon (baritone) (1930–1988), American baritone and actor
 Ken Reardon (1921–2008), Canadian professional ice hockey player
 Kerry Reardon (born 1949), American football player
 Mara Candelaria Reardon, American politician and representative (Indiana Democrats)
 Michael Reardon (climber) (1965–2007), American professional Free Solo Climber, filmmaker, motivational speaker and writer
 Michael Reardon (architect), English architect, historic building consultant, and interior designer
 Michael Reardon (activist) (1876–1945), New Zealand political activist
 Nathan Reardon (born 1984), Australian professional cricketer
 Paul Reardon (1909–1988), Justice of the Massachusetts Supreme Judicial Court 
 Phil Reardon (1883–1920), American professional baseball player
 Ray Reardon (born 1932), retired Welsh snooker player
 Sean Reardon, American sociologist
 Steve Reardon (born 1971), Australian rugby league player
 Stuart Reardon (born 1981), English rugby league player
 Terry Reardon (1919–1993), Canadian professional ice hockey player
 Thomas Reardon (born 1969), creator of Internet Explorer
 William Reardon Smith (1856–1935), British shipowner

See also
 Reardon Smith baronets, a title in the Baronetage of the United Kingdom